Petit is a small, bowl-shaped lunar impact crater that is located on the northwestern edge of the Mare Spumans. The crater has a prominent ray system. The name is appropriate, since petite means small in French. But it was actually named in honor of Alexis Thérèse Petit, a French physicist.

The crater lies to the south of the crater Townley, and east of Condon. Farther to the northwest is Apollonius. Petit was previously designated Apollonius W before being given a name by the IAU.

External links
 LTO-62C4 Condon — L&PI topographic map

References

 
 
 
 
 
 
 
 
 
 
 
 

Impact craters on the Moon